Carl Daniel Crowe (born 25 November 1975) is an English former first-class cricketer. Crowe was a right-handed batsman and right-arm off break bowler. He was born in Leicester, Leicestershire.

Crowe made his first-class debut for Leicestershire in the 1995 County Championship against Warwickshire. From 1995 to 2009, he represented the county in 42 first-class matches, the last of which came in the 2009 County Championship when Leicestershire played Gloucestershire. In his 42 first-class matches, he scored 695 runs at a batting average of 15.79, with a high score of 44*. With the ball he took 60 wickets at a bowling average of 37.85, with best figures of 4/47.

Crowe also represented Leicestershire in 38 List-A matches, with his debut in that format for the county coming in the 1996 AXA Equity and Law League when Leicestershire played Middlesex. From 1996 to 2009, he represented the county in 38 List-A matches, with his final appearance for the county in that format coming against Worcestershire in the 2009 Friends Provident Trophy. In his 38 List-A matches for the county, he scored 184 runs at an average of 18.40, with a high score of 23*. With the ball he took 32 wickets for the county at an average of 32.00, with best figures of 4/30.

Crowe also represented Leicestershire in a single Twenty20 match in the 2009 Twenty20 Cup against Derbyshire at Grace Road, Leicester. During the match in scored 9 runs. Crowe left the county at the end of the 2009 season.

While representing Leicestershire, Crowe also represented Berkshire in the Minor Counties Championship, making his debut for the county in the 2003 Championship against Cheshire. From 2003 to present, he represented has represented the county in 33 Minor Counties Championship matches. Crowe has also played in the MCCA Knockout Trophy for Berkshire. His debut in that competition for the county came in 2003 when Berkshire played Hertfordshire. From 2003 to present, he has represented the county in 27 Trophy matches.

He also played a single 2 List-A matches for Berkshire, firstly in the 2004 Cheltenham & Gloucester Trophy against Kent and lastly against Gloucestershire in the 2005 Cheltenham & Gloucester Trophy at Sonning Lane, Reading. In his 2 List-A matches he scored 3 runs at an average of 1.50, with a high score of 2. With the ball he took a single wicket at a cost of 47. Crowe holds the role of Berkshire player-coach.

Coaching career
He was appointed as spin bowling coach for Kolkata Knight Riders.

Family
His brother Craig has played List-A cricket for the Leicestershire Cricket Board, as well as playing Minor counties cricket for Berkshire.

References

External links
Carl Crowe at Cricinfo
Carl Crowe at CricketArchive

1975 births
Living people
Cricketers from Leicester
English cricketers
Leicestershire cricketers
Berkshire cricketers
English cricket coaches